In the 2014–15 season, Partizan NIS Belgrade competed in the Basketball League of Serbia, the Radivoj Korać Cup, the Adriatic League and the Eurocup.

Players

Current roster

Depth chart

Roster changes

In

Out

Competitions

Basketball League of Serbia

Standings

Pld - Played; W - Won; L - Lost; PF - Points for; PA - Points against; Diff - Difference; Pts - Points.

Results and positions by round

Matches

Regular Season

{{basketballbox|bg=#D0F0C0
|date= 27 May 2015
|time= 18:00
|report= Stats
|teamA= Metalac Farmakom
|scoreA= 62
|scoreB= 80
|Q1= 10-24
|Q2= 13-22
|Q3= 23-17
|Q4= 16-17|OT=
|teamB= Partizan NIS
|points1= Ljubičić 10
|rebounds1= Jeremić 5
|assist1= Otašević 3
|points2= Andrić 14
|rebounds2= Milutinov 14
|assist2= Dallo 5
|place= Valjevo Sports Hall, Valjevo
|attendance=1,500
|referee= Milivoje Jovičić, Dragan Nešković, Uroš Nikolić.
}}

Semi-finals

Statistics

Radivoj Korać Cup

Matches
Quarterfinals

Semirfinals

Statistics

Adriatic League

Standings

Pld - Played; W - Won; L - Lost; PF - Points for; PA - Points against; Diff - Difference; Pts - Points.

Results and positions by round

Matches

Regular Season

Semi-finals

Statistics

Eurocup

Statistics

Updated: 17 December 2014

Standings

Group E

Fixtures and resultsAll times given below are in Central European Time.''

Charity game "Grobari za nas"
On Wednesday, 11 March 2015 Partizan fans have organized a charity match between Partizan former players and active players mixed in white and black team. The reason for organizing this activity is to help KK Partizan which is in a very difficult Financial situation. Money was collected from ticket sales, and responded to the call by many celebrities and former athletes.

Individual awardsEurocupEurocup MVP of the Round Milan Mačvan – Regular season, Week 10Adriatic LeagueThe ideal five
 Aleksandar Pavlović 
 Milan Mačvan

MVP of the Month
 Milan Mačvan – January 2015

MVP of the Round
 Milan Mačvan – Round 17
 Milan Mačvan – Semi-finals, Game 2
 Edo Murić – Semi-finals, Game 4Basketball League of Serbia'''

MVP of the Round
 Nikola Milutinov – Round 1
 Milan Mačvan – Round 2

References

External links

 Official website 

2014-15
2014–15 in Serbian basketball by club
2014–15 Euroleague by club